Kevin James Schuler (born 11 March 1967) is a New Zealand rugby union coach and former rugby union player. A flanker, Schuler represented Manawatu and North Harbour at a provincial level, and was a member of the New Zealand national side, the All Blacks, between 1989 and 1995. He played 13 matches for the All Blacks including four internationals and the 1995 Rugby World Cup. He moved to Japan in 1996 and played for Yamaha Júbilo, where he became player–coach and later head coach.

In 1990, Schuler was named Manawatu sportsperson of the year.

References

1967 births
Living people
Expatriate rugby union players in Japan
Manawatu rugby union players
Massey University alumni
New Zealand expatriate rugby union players
New Zealand expatriate sportspeople in Japan
New Zealand international rugby union players
New Zealand rugby union coaches
New Zealand rugby union players
North Harbour rugby union players
Rugby union flankers
Rugby union players from Te Aroha
Shizuoka Blue Revs players